San Costantino  may refer to:

 San Costantino Albanese, town and comune in the province of Potenza, in the Southern Italian region of Basilicata
 San Costantino Calabro, municipality in the Province of Vibo Valentia in the Italian region Calabria